Macclesfield Football Club is an English football club based in Macclesfield, Cheshire. The club played in the Football League from 1996–97 until relegation to the Conference Premier was confirmed on 28 April 2012. The club was formed in 1874 and the team play their home games at the 6,355 capacity Moss Rose stadium.

Key

Key to league record
 Level = Level of the league in the current league system
 Pld = Games played
 W = Games won
 D = Games drawn
 L = Games lost
 GF = Goals for
 GA = Goals against
 GD = Goals difference
 Pts = Points
 Position = Position in the final league table
 Top scorer and number of goals scored shown in bold when he was also top scorer for the division. Number of goals includes goals scored in play-offs.

Key to cup records
 Res = Final reached round
 Rec = Final club record in the form of wins-draws-losses
 PR = Preliminary round
 QR1 (2, etc.) = Qualifying Cup rounds
 G = Group stage
 R1 (2, etc.) = Proper Cup rounds
 QF = Quarter-finalists
 SF = Semi-finalists
 F = Finalists
 A (QF, SF, F) = Area quarter-, semi-, finalists
 W = Winners

Seasons
The Silkmen spent much of the 20th century in the Cheshire County League before becoming founder members of the Northern Premier League in 1968. They were NPL champions in its first two seasons, beating Wigan Athletic to the title on both occasions. They were champions again in 1986–87, earning promotion to the Football Conference. They were Conference champions in 1994-95 but failed to gain election to the Football League. Two years later they were champions again and gained promotion in successive years to spend 1998–99 in Division Two before falling back to the fourth tier of English football (Division Three/League Two) and then being relegated to the conference in 2012.

Notes

References

 
Macclesfield Town